This is a list of moths of the family Pyralidae that are found in South Africa. It also acts as an index to the species articles and forms part of the full List of moths of South Africa.

Abachausia grisea Balinsky, 1994
Abrephia incongruella (Warren, 1914)
Achroia grisella (Fabricius, 1794)
Achroia innotata Walker, 1864
Acrobasis africanella Balinsky, 1994
Acrobasis diversicolor Ragonot, 1893
Acrobasis ramosella Walker, 1866
Actenia achromalis Hampson, 1906
Actenia obliquisignalis Hampson, 1906
Actenia rhodesialis Hampson, 1906
Afromyelois communis Balinsky, 1991
Afromylea natalica Balinsky, 1994
Afropsipyla pictella Balinsky, 1994
Afropsipyla similis Balinsky, 1994
Aglossa basalis Walker, 1865
Aglossa ferrealis Hampson, 1906
Aglossa formosa Butler, 1875
Aglossa inconspicua Butler, 1875
Aglossa incultalis Zeller, 1852
Aglossa infuscalis Hampson, 1906
Aglossa pinguinalis (Linnaeus, 1758)
Aglossa rhodalis Hampson, 1906
Aglossa steralis Felder & Rogenhofer, 1875
Aglossa thermochroa Hampson, 1916
Aglossodes prionophoralis Ragonot, 1891
Alispoides vermiculella Ragonot, 1888
Ambetilia curcifera Balinsky, 1994
Anagasta kuehniella (Zeller, 1879)
Ancylosis aeola Balinsky, 1987
Ancylosis albipunctella (Warren, 1914)
Ancylosis atrisparsella (Hampson, 1901)
Ancylosis bohemani (Zeller, 1852)
Ancylosis capensis Ragonot, 1888
Ancylosis detersella Hampson, 1926
Ancylosis eugraphella Balinsky, 1987
Ancylosis eurhoda Balinsky, 1989
Ancylosis glaphyria Balinsky, 1987
Ancylosis inangulella Warren, 1914
Ancylosis interjectella (Ragonot, 1888)
Ancylosis luederitzella Balinsky, 1989
Ancylosis melanophlebia Balinsky, 1989
Ancylosis montana Balinsky, 1989
Ancylosis namibiella Balinsky, 1987
Ancylosis obscurella Balinsky, 1989
Ancylosis ocellella (Hampson, 1901)
Ancylosis perfervida Balinsky, 1989
Ancylosis rufociliella Ragonot, 1888
Ancylosis similis Balinsky, 1987
Ancylosis subpyrethrella (Ragonot, 1888)
Ancylosis ustocapitella (Hampson, 1901)
Anerastia flaveolella Ragonot, 1887
Anobostra discimacula Hampson, 1917
Aphomia caffralis Hampson, 1917
Aphomia distictella Hampson, 1917
Aphomia murina (Wallengren, 1875)
Aphomia zelleri (de Joannis, 1932)
Apomyelois bicolorata Balinsky, 1991
Arsissa transvaalica Balinsky, 1991
Aspithroides minuta Balinsky, 1994
Azanicola adspersa Balinsky, 1991
Bahiria defecta Balinsky, 1994
Bahiria durbanica Balinsky, 1994
Bahiria flavicosta Balinsky, 1994
Bahiria latevalva Balinsky, 1994
Bahiria macrognatha Balinsky, 1994
Bahiria magna Balinsky, 1994
Bahiria similis Balinsky, 1994
Bahiria ximenianata Balinsky, 1994
Biafra concinnella Ragonot, 1888
Biafra separatella (Ragonot, 1888)
Bostra albilineata (Warren, 1891)
Bostra carnicolor Warren, 1914
Bostra coenochroa Hampson, 1917
Bostra conflualis Hampson, 1906
Bostra conspicualis Warren, 1911
Bostra dipectinialis Hampson, 1906
Bostra exustalis (Guenée, 1854)
Bostra ferrealis Hampson, 1906
Bostra flavicostalis Warren, 1914
Bostra glaucalis Hampson, 1906
Bostra lateritialis (Guenée, 1854)
Bostra maculilinea Hampson, 1917
Bostra mucidalis (Guenée, 1854)
Bostra noctuina (Butler, 1875)
Bostra pallidicolor Hampson, 1917
Bostra pallidifrons Hampson, 1917
Bostra perrubida Hampson, 1910
Bostra puncticostalis Hampson, 1898
Bostra pyroxantha Hampson, 1906
Bostra rufimarginalis Hampson, 1906
Bostra sentalis Hampson, 1906
Bostra tenebralis Hampson, 1906
Bostra tripartita (Warren, 1897)
Bostra tristis (Butler, 1881)
Bostra vetustalis (Zeller, 1852)
Bostra xanthorhodalis Hampson, 1906
Cabotella inconspicua Balinsky, 1994
Cactoblastis cactorum (Berg, 1885)
Cadra cautella (Walker, 1863)
Cadra figulilella (Gregson, 1871)
Cadra rectivittella (Ragonot, 1901)
Candiope joannisella Ragonot, 1888
Candiopella dukei Balinsky, 1994
Cantheleamima excisa Balinsky, 1994
Caustella phoenicias Hampson, 1930
Ceuthelea umtalensis Balinsky, 1994
Ceutholopha isidis (Zeller, 1867)
Commotria albinervella Hampson, 1918
Commotria castaneipars Hampson, 1918
Commotria leucosparsalis Janse, 1922
Commotria phlebicella Hampson, 1918
Commotria rhodoneura Hampson, 1918
Corcyra cephalonica (Stainton, 1866)
Cryptoblabes gnidiella (Millière, 1867)
Cunibertoides nigripatagiata Balinsky, 1994
Delopterus basalis Janse, 1922
Didia subramosella Ragonot, 1893
Discofrontia normella Hampson, 1901
Ditrachyptera verruciferella (Ragonot, 1888)
Dysphylia viridella Ragonot, 1888
Ectomyelois ceratoniae (Zeller, 1839)
Eldana saccharina Walker, 1865
Elegia inconspicuella (Ragonot, 1888)
Eleusina homoeosomella Hampson, 1901
Ematheudes convexus Shaffer, 1997
Ematheudes crassinotellus Ragonot, 1888
Ematheudes elysium Shaffer, 1997
Ematheudes erectus Shaffer, 1997
Ematheudes hispidus Shaffer, 1997
Ematheudes maculescens Shaffer, 1997
Ematheudes natalensis Shaffer, 1997
Ematheudes neonepsia Martin, 1956
Ematheudes neurias (Hampson, 1918)
Ematheudes paleatellus Ragonot, 1888
Ematheudes rhodochrous (Hampson, 1918)
Ematheudes setiger Shaffer, 1997
Ematheudes sinuosus Shaffer, 1997
Ematheudes straminella Snellen, 1872
Ematheudes strictus Shaffer, 1997
Ematheudes toxalis Shaffer, 1997
Ematheudes triangularis Shaffer, 1997
Emmalocera laminella Hampson, 1901
Emmalocera leucopleura (Hampson, 1918)
Emporia melanobasis Balinsky, 1991
Encryphodes ethiopella Balinsky, 1991
Endolasia transvaalica Hampson, 1926
Endotricha consobrinalis Zeller, 1852
Endotricha ellisoni Whalley, 1963
Endotricha erythralis Mabille, 1900
Ephestia elutella (Hübner, 1796)
Epicrocis abbreviata (Balinsky, 1994)
Epicrocis africana (Janse, 1942)
Epicrocis africanella (Ragonot, 1888)
Epicrocis albigeralis (Walker, 1865)
Epicrocis ancylosiformis (Balinsky, 1994)
Epicrocis arcana (Balinsky, 1994)
Epicrocis atratella (Ragonot, 1888)
Epicrocis brevipalpata (Balinsky, 1994)
Epicrocis complicata (Balinsky, 1994)
Epicrocis coriacelloides (Balinsky, 1994)
Epicrocis crassa (Balinsky, 1994)
Epicrocis ferrealis (Hampson, 1898)
Epicrocis flavicosta (Balinsky, 1994)
Epicrocis furcilinea (Balinsky, 1994)
Epicrocis gracilis (Balinsky, 1994)
Epicrocis holophaea (Hampson, 1926)
Epicrocis imitans (Balinsky, 1994)
Epicrocis insolita (Balinsky, 1994)
Epicrocis intermedia (Balinsky, 1994)
Epicrocis laticostella (Ragonot, 1888)
Epicrocis nigricans (Ragonot, 1888)
Epicrocis nigrinella (Balinsky, 1994)
Epicrocis noncapillata (Balinsky, 1994)
Epicrocis ornata (Balinsky, 1994)
Epicrocis ornatella (Balinsky, 1994)
Epicrocis picta (Balinsky, 1991)
Epicrocis piliferella (Ragonot, 1888)
Epicrocis plumbifasciata (Balinsky, 1994)
Epicrocis pseudonatalensis (Balinsky, 1994)
Epicrocis punctata (Balinsky, 1994)
Epicrocis sacculata (Balinsky, 1994)
Epicrocis saturatella Mabille, 1879
Epicrocis siderella (Ragonot, 1888)
Epicrocis spiculata (Balinsky, 1994)
Epicrocis stibiella (Snellen, 1872)
Epicrocis vansoni (Balinsky, 1994)
Epilepia melanobasis (Hampson, 1906)
Epilepia melanobrunnea (Janse, 1922)
Epilepia melanosparsalis (Janse, 1922)
Epilepia melapastalis (Hampson, 1906)
Episindris albimaculalis Ragonot, 1891
Essina atribasalis Ragonot, 1891
Etiella zinckenella (Treitschke, 1832)
Eucarphia anomala Balinsky, 1994
Eucarphia leucomera (Hampson, 1926)
Eulophota caustella (Hampson, 1901)
Eulophota zonata Hampson, 1926
Eurhodope confusella (Walker, 1866)
Eurhodope infixella (Walker, 1866)
Eurhodope notulella (Ragonot, 1888)
Eurhodope nyctosia Balinsky, 1991
Euzophera crassignatha Balinsky, 1994
Euzophera crinita Balinsky, 1994
Euzophera cullinanensis (Balinsky, 1991)
Euzophera minima Balinsky, 1994
Euzophera neomeniella Ragonot, 1888
Euzophera stramentella Ragonot, 1888
Euzophera termivelata Balinsky, 1994
Euzophera villora (Felder & Rogenhofer, 1875)
Euzopherodes capicola Balinsky, 1994
Faveria dionysia (Zeller, 1846)
Faveria dubia (Balinsky, 1994)
Faveria fusca (Balinsky, 1994)
Faveria ignicephalis (Balinsky, 1994)
Faveria minima (Balinsky, 1994)
Faveria minuscula (Balinsky, 1994)
Faveria nonceracanthia (Balinsky, 1994)
Faveria onigra (Balinsky, 1994)
Faveria poliostrota (Balinsky, 1994)
Flabellobasis capensis (Hampson, 1901)
Flabellobasis montana Balinsky, 1991
Gaana asperella (Ragonot, 1893)
Gaana basiferella Walker, 1866
Gaana mesophaea (Hampson, 1930)
Gaana minima Balinsky, 1994
Gaana quatra Balinsky, 1994
Galleria mellonella (Linnaeus, 1758)
Getulia fulviplagella Hampson, 1901
Getulia institella Ragonot, 1888
Getulia maculosa Balinsky, 1994
Getulia semifuscella Ragonot, 1893
Grammiphlebia striata (Druce, 1902)
Hannemanneia tacapella (Ragonot, 1887)
Herculia caesalis (Zeller, 1852)
Herculia griseobrunnea Hampson, 1917
Herculia lacteocilia Hampson, 1917
Herculia roseotincta Hampson, 1917
Herculia tenuis (Butler, 1880)
Heterochrosis oligochrodes Hampson, 1926
Hobohmia paradoxa Balinsky, 1994
Homoeosoma botydella Ragonot, 1888
Homoeosoma masaiense Balinsky, 1991
Homoeosoma quinquepunctella (Warren, 1914)
Homoeosoma scopulella Ragonot, 1888
Homoeosoma stenoteum Hampson, 1926
Homoeosoma terminella Ragonot, 1901
Hosidia ochrineurella Hampson, 1901
Hydaspia dorsipunctella Ragonot, 1888
Hypargyria metalliferella Ragonot, 1888
Hypotia aglossalis (Hampson, 1906)
Hypotia bolinalis (Walker, 1859)
Hypotia grisescens (Warren, 1914)
Hypotia ornata Druce, 1902
Hypotia pallidicarnea (Warren, 1914)
Hypotia phaeagonalis (Hampson, 1906)
Hypsipyla robusta (Moore, 1886)
Hypsopygia mauritialis (Boisduval, 1833)
Hypsopygia sanguinalis Warren, 1897
Hypsotropa adumbratella Ragonot, 1888
Hypsotropa chionorhabda Hampson, 1918
Hypsotropa contrastella (Ragonot, 1888)
Hypsotropa graptophlebia Hampson, 1918
Hypsotropa infumatella Ragonot, 1901
Hypsotropa leucophlebiella (Ragonot, 1888)
Hypsotropa ochricostella Hampson, 1918
Hypsotropa polyactinia (Hampson, 1901)
Hypsotropa rhodochroella Hampson, 1918
Hypsotropa roseotincta Janse, 1922
Hypsotropa sabuletella (Zeller, 1852)
Hypsotropa subcostella Hampson, 1918
Isolopha albicristata Warren, 1911
Joannisia conisella (Hampson, 1926)
Joannisia heterotypa Balinsky, 1994
Joannisia jansei Balinsky, 1994
Joannisia poliopasta Balinsky, 1994
Joannisia semiales Balinsky, 1994
Lamoria adaptella (Walker, 1863)
Lamoria anella ([Denis & Schiffermüller], 1775)
Lamoria attamasca Whalley, 1964
Lamoria cafrella (Ragonot, 1888)
Lamoria exiguata Whalley, 1964
Lamoria imbella (Walker, 1864)
Lamoria pallens Whalley, 1964
Laodamia affinis Balinsky, 1994
Laodamia glaucocephalis Balinsky, 1994
Laodamia grisella Balinsky, 1994
Laodamia homotypa Balinsky, 1994
Laodamia hortensis Balinsky, 1994
Laodamia inermis Balinsky, 1994
Laodamia injucunda Balinsky, 1994
Laodamia karkloofensis Balinsky, 1994
Laodamia lugubris Balinsky, 1994
Laodamia natalensis (Ragonot, 1888)
Laodamia nigerrima Balinsky, 1994
Laodamia nonplagella Balinsky, 1994
Laodamia pulchra Balinsky, 1994
Laodamia salisburyensis Balinsky, 1994
Laodamia sarniensis Balinsky, 1994
Laodamia similis Balinsky, 1994
Laodamia spissa Balinsky, 1994
Laodamia squamata Balinsky, 1994
Laodamia zoetendalensis Balinsky, 1994
Lepidogma rubricalis Hampson, 1906
Leviantenna ferox Balinsky, 1994
Loryma athalialis (Walker, 1859)
Loryma recusata (Walker, 1864)
Loryma sentiusalis Walker, 1859
Loryma sinuosalis Leraut, 2007
Lorymodes digonialis (Hampson, 1906)
Lorymodes stenopteralis Hampson, 1917
Macalla confusa Janse, 1922
Macalla fasciculata Hampson, 1906
Macrovalva quadrielevata Balinsky, 1994
Megasis barrettae Hampson, 1901
Melanalis perfusca Hampson, 1906
Melanastia bicolor Hampson, 1930
Metacrateria perirrorella Hampson, 1918
Metoecis carnifex (Coquerel, 1855)
Miliberta gnathilata Balinsky, 1994
Mittonia hampsoni (Distant, 1897)
Mussidia melanoneura Ragonot, 1893
Mussidia nigrivenella Ragonot, 1888
Myelodes flavimargo Hampson, 1930
Myelodes jansei Hampson, 1930
Namibicola simplex Balinsky, 1994
Namibicola splendida Balinsky, 1991
Namibiopsis punctata Balinsky, 1994
Navasota leuconeurella Hampson, 1918
Neobostra ferruginealis Hampson, 1906
Neopaschia flavociliata Janse, 1922
Nephopterix angustella (Hübner, 1796)
Nephopterix apotomella (Meyrick, 1886)
Nephopterix caradrinella Ragonot, 1893
Nephopterix divisella (Duponchel, 1842)
Nephopterix emussitatella Ragonot, 1893
Nephopterix quilimanella Pagenstecher, 1893
Nephopterix rufostriatella Pagenstecher, 1893
Nephopterix variella Walker, 1866
Nonphycita lineata Balinsky, 1994
Nyctegretis inclinella Ragonot, 1888
Nyctegretis leonina (Hampson, 1930)
Oligochroides nigritella Strand, 1909
Oncocera ochreomelanella (Ragonot, 1888)
Orthaga cryptochalcis de Joannis, 1927
Ortholepis polyodonta Balinsky, 1991
Ortholepis pyrobasis Balinsky, 1991
Ortholepis rectilineella (Ragonot, 1888)
Ortholepis subgenistella (Hampson, 1901)
Ortholepis unguinata Balinsky, 1994
Oryctocera aurocupralis Ragonot, 1891
Oxybia transversella (Duponchel, 1836)
Paractenia atrisparsalis Hampson, 1906
Paractenia phaeomesalis Hampson, 1906
Paractenia thermalis Hampson, 1906
Paralaodamia angustata Balinsky, 1994
Paralaodamia fraudulenta Balinsky, 1994
Paralaodamia grapholithella (Ragonot, 1888)
Paralaodamia haploa Balinsky, 1994
Paralaodamia modesta Balinsky, 1994
Paralaodamia pretoriensis Balinsky, 1994
Paralaodamia rivulella (Ragonot, 1888)
Paralaodamia serrata Balinsky, 1994
Paralaodamia subdivisella (Ragonot, 1893)
Paralaodamia subligaculata Balinsky, 1994
Paralaodamia transvaalica Balinsky, 1994
Paralipsa exacta Whalley, 1962
Paraphomia natalensis Hampson, 1901
Parematheudes crista Shaffer, 1997
Parematheudes diacanthus Shaffer, 1997
Parematheudes dionyx Shaffer, 1997
Parematheudes hamulus Shaffer, 1997
Parematheudes immaculatus Shaffer, 1997
Parematheudes interpunctellus (Hampson, 1918)
Parematheudes onyx Shaffer, 1997
Parematheudes polystictellus (Hampson, 1918)
Parematheudes roseotinctus (Janse, 1922)
Parematheudes simplex (Janse, 1922)
Parematheudes tenuis Shaffer, 1997
Pempelia aurivilliella (Ragonot, 1888)
Pempelia morosalis (Saalmüller, 1880)
Pempelia palumbella ([Denis & Schiffermüller], 1775)
Phycita attenuata Balinsky, 1994
Phycita exaggerata Balinsky, 1994
Phycita ligubris Balinsky, 1994
Phycita randensis Balinsky, 1994
Phycita singularis Balinsky, 1994
Phycita spiculata Balinsky, 1994
Phycita spissoterminata Balinsky, 1994
Phycita suppenditata Balinsky, 1994
Phycitophila obscurita Balinsky, 1994
Phycitopsis insulata Balinsky, 1994
Piesmopoda notandella Ragonot, 1893
Plagoa cerostomella (Ragonot, 1888)
Plagoa zambeziella (Hampson, 1901)
Plodia interpunctella (Hübner, [1813])
Pogononeura hirticostella Ragonot, 1888
Pogonotropha wahlbergi Zeller, 1852
Polyocha anomalella Janse, 1922
Polyocha plinthochroa Hampson, 1918
Polyocha rhodesiae Strand, 1909
Polyocha sanguinariella (Zeller, 1848)
Pretoria hutchinsoni Ragonot, 1893
Pretoria nigribasis Balinsky, 1994
Proancylosis argenticostata Balinsky, 1991
Prophtasia sphalmatella Hampson, 1918
Prosaris pulverea Hampson, 1906
Prosaris rufalis Hampson, 1906
Pseudogetulia luminosa Balinsky, 1994
Pseudographis dermatina Balinsky, 1994
Pseudographis mesosema Balinsky, 1989
Psorosa africana Balinsky, 1991
Psorosa myrmidonella Ragonot, 1901
Pylamorpha albida Balinsky, 1994
Pylamorpha cristata Balinsky, 1994
Pyralis albilautalis Warren, 1891
Pyralis biblisalis (Walker, 1859)
Pyralis dentibasalis Warren, 1914
Pyralis effulgens Warren, 1914
Pyralis farinalis Linnaeus, 1758
Pyralis fumipennis Butler, 1889
Pyralis manihotalis Guenée, 1854
Pyralis rubellalis Zeller, 1852
Pyralis secretalis Wallengren, 1875
Pyralosis polycyclophora (Hampson, 1916)
Quasiexuperius rhodesianus Balinsky, 1994
Ramosignathos inconspicuella Balinsky, 1994
Rhinaphe castanealis Hampson, 1912
Rhinaphe flavodorsalis Janse, 1922
Rhinaphe lutosa Janse, 1922
Rhinaphe nigricostalis (Walker, 1863)
Rhinaphe seeboldi (Ragonot, 1894)
Rhodochrysa superbella Hampson, 1901
Rhynchopaschia melanolopha Hampson, 1906
Rhynchopaschia reducta Janse, 1931
Sacada rhodinalis Hampson, 1906
Sacada rosealis Hampson, 1906
Saluria albicostella Janse, 1922
Saluria devylderi (Ragonot, 1888)
Saluria inficita (Walker, 1863)
Saluria macrella (Ragonot, 1888)
Saluria mesomelanella Hampson, 1918
Saluria pretoriae Janse, 1922
Saluria pulverata Janse, 1922
Saluria rhodophaea Hampson, 1918
Saluria stictophora Hampson, 1918
Saluria subcarnella (Ragonot, 1888)
Saluria tripartitella Ragonot, 1901
Samaria inconspicuella Balinsky, 1994
Samaria indentella Ragonot, 1893
Sematoneura africana Balinsky, 1994
Shebania grandis Balinsky, 1991
Shebania maculata Balinsky, 1991
Sindris magnifica Jordan, 1904
Sindris sganzini Boisduval, 1833
Spatulipalpia monstrosa Balinsky, 1994
Sphinctocera crassisquama Warren, 1897
Statina albivenella Janse, 1922
Staudingeria magnifica (Butler, 1875)
Staudingeria mimeugraphella Balinsky, 1989
Stemmatophora chloralis Hampson, 1917
Stemmatophora depressalis Walker, 1862
Stemmatophora erebalis Hampson, 1917
Stemmatophora flavirubralis Warren, 1891
Stemmatophora hemicyclalis Hampson, 1917
Stemmatophora oleagina (Warren, 1891)
Stemmatophora perrubralis Hampson, 1917
Stemmatophora xanthozonalis Hampson, 1906
Synaphe styphlotricha Hampson, 1906
Synoria euglyphella Ragonot, 1888
Tegulifera bostralis Hampson, 1917
Tegulifera flavirubralis (Hampson, 1906)
Tegulifera holothermalis Hampson, 1906
Tegulifera oblunata (Warren, 1897)
Tegulifera obovalis Hampson, 1917
Tegulifera ochrealis Hampson, 1917
Tegulifera rubicundalis Saalmüller, 1880
Tegulifera zonalis (Warren, 1897)
Thylacoptila paurosema Meyrick, 1885
Trachylepidia fructicassiella Ragonot, 1887
Trachypteryx acanthotecta Rebel, 1927
Trachypteryx albisecta Hampson, 1926
Trachypteryx heterogramma Hampson, 1926
Trachypteryx magella (Zeller, 1848)
Trachypteryx rhodoxantha Hampson, 1926
Trachypteryx rubripictella Hampson, 1901
Trachypteryx victoriola Balinsky, 1991
Triphassa marshalli (Hampson, 1906)
Triphassa stalachtis Hübner, 1818
Tucumania tapiacola Dyar, 1925
Tyndis dentilinealis Hampson, 1906
Tyndis proteanalis Hampson, 1906
Ulophora flavinia Balinsky, 1994
Urbania lophopterella Hampson, 1901
Veldticola irrorella Hampson, 1930
Veldticola megista Hampson, 1930
Veldticola nebulosella Hampson, 1930
Veldticola persinuella Hampson, 1930
Veldticola striatella Hampson, 1930
Zitha allutalis (Zeller, 1852)
Zitha ignalis (Guenée, 1854)
Zitha laminalis (Guenée, 1854)
Zitha punicealis Walker, 1866
Zitha subcupralis (Zeller, 1852)
Zitha subochracea (Warren, 1897)
Zophodia ebeniella (Ragonot, 1888)
Zophodia lignea de Joannis, 1927

Pyralidae
 South Africa
Moths of Africa